Blanche Brillon Macdonald (11 May 1931 – 8 June 1985) was a Canadian Métis born in Faust, Alberta of French and First Nations heritage. She launched her career as the winner of Miss English Bay in 1949 before becoming involved in the support of the rights and culture of Aboriginal peoples as well as numerous women's organizations.

Métis identity
Blanche Macdonald grew up in a Métis family. Given the social conditions in the 1930s of tension between the Indigenous and European-descended populations, being Métis meant fighting much harder for your spot in society. The influence of Blanche's Cree-speaking grandmother, along with witnessing traditional Aboriginal practices as a part of everyday life rooted the rest of Blanche's life as a proud, strong Aboriginal woman.

In the 1960s, Blanche started to reclaim her Indigenous identity and become more involved in the Aboriginal community in Vancouver. 1 year after the Friendship Centre opened (called The Vancouver Indian Centre at the time), she was sitting on the board. Blanche also worked with First Nations designers and discovered and promoted Indigenous models. Blanche ran Self Appreciation classes in prisons (for men and women) at Oakalla, Matsqui and Maples Women's Prison. Blanche was working for the United Native Nations of which she organized the first ever United Native Nations Conference, the Friendship Centre, and was a founding member of the Professional Native Woman's Association.

Blanche was a business woman at a time and place in history when the climate for women in business was not favourable.  She became involved in the First Nations women's movement, eventually initiating a journalism program for Native students as well as a newspaper catering towards First Nation communities across British Columbia. For her work, she was honored with a Women of Distinction Award from the YWCA for business and entrepreneurship as well as for her role as the Chief Executive Officer of the Native Communications Society of B.C.  She was a board member for the Better Business Bureau (BBB), the Modelling Association of America, the New Play Centre, and the Lakeside Advisory Board for Women.

Blanche was living with her children on the Musqueam Indian Reserve in the 80s and was also teaching classes to Musqueam youth from her home. In 1980, Blanche was adopted into the James Sewid Family at an Alert Bay Potlatch Ceremony.

Growing up
Blanche Mae Brillon was born to John Brillon and Marie Aloysa Ouellette on May 11, 1931 in Faust, Alberta. Her father John was French, and her mother was Cree Métis. Blanche was one of five children born to John and Eliza: Wylie Leonard Brillon (April 14, 1929), John Brillon (June 8, 1925), Lawrence Martin Brillon (May 2, 1927), and Helen Corrine (Sheila) Brillon (November 28, 1935). In 1942, the Brillon family split in two when John and Eliza ended their marriage. Around 1943, Eliza, Blanche and Sheila were living in Vancouver's Downtown Eastside in a rooming house on Powell Street as the girls attended Strathcona School. In 1945, Eliza moved her girls again to Bremerton, Washington where she met her second husband, Charles Johnmeyer. Blanche's stepfather, Charles was a naval engineer, and was soon repositioned to Kodiak, Alaska in 1945. In 1949, at 17 years old, Blanche was diagnosed with TB, and sent to the Tranquille Sanatorium in Kamloops, BC.

After her treatment for TB, Blanche returned to Kodiak for about one more year. At 20, she moved back to Vancouver.  At 21, Blanche had a relapse of TB and returned to Tranquille for approximately 1 more year. When she returned to Vancouver in 1952, she joined the modeling school Elizabeth Leslie. During the year of 1952, Blanche was living in the West End, and won the Miss English Bay Pageant. For the next two years, Blanche continued to model and work for Elizabeth Leslie.

Adulthood and the Blanche Macdonald Institute
In 1954, Elizabeth Leslie asked Blanche to move to Edmonton to open another branch of the school. This is where she met her husband Jack Macdonald. She gave birth to her first daughter, Alexis Macdonald on September 13, 1958 in Dawson Creek, BC. In 1959, the young family moved to North Delta, and their second son, Allan Macdonald, was born in Surrey, British Columbia on December 8, 1959.

In 1960, the Macdonalds move Alexis Macdonald to the British Properties in West Vancouver and opened modelling agency and school of fashion, Blanche Macdonald Ltd. in Vancouver, BC. Her career and self-development programs were founded on the philosophy of encouraging people to aspire to their highest potential through personal development. Through the 1960s, her life consisted of fashion shows, lectures, social events, working with designers, hair salons, airlines, department stores, creating specialized courses, starting a modelling agency with Jerry Lodge, and running a cross-country tour to promote Canadian fashion. Blanche was at the forefront of Vancouver's emerging fashion scene and culture. She sold the school to business partner and Toronto agent Jerry Lodge and started teaching classes at a local department store in Kodiak, Alaska after moving there with her two children. 15 months later, in 1972, the family moved back to Vancouver in Horseshoe Bay. Blanche borrowed money and bought back her school for $800. She worked to create programs to build the long lasting careers of women who wanted to become self-sufficient. The Blanche Macdonald School raised the standards for education in this field. After a 3-month stay in Mexico, Blanche returned to Vancouver in 1983 and sat on the board for The New Play Centre and the Woman's Network. She changed her school's name to Blanche Macdonald Institute and had 15 full-time employees and 40 part-time instructors.

In 1985, she won the YWCA Woman of Distinction Award for Business and the Professions. Blanche died in June 1985.

The Blanche Macdonald Institute was sold to Lillian Lim in 1988 and eventually renamed the institute the Blanche Macdonald Centre in the late 1990s. The school continues to run today as The Blanche Macdonald Centre with three locations in downtown Vancouver. Today, Blanche Macdonald Centre is a private college that provide careers in makeup, fashion, hairstyling, aesthetics/spa and nail. The college has three campuses, the original campus is located in City Square Mall and the other two are on Robson Street both in the city of Vancouver.

Awards
 1985: YWCA Women of Distinction Award

See also
 Notable Aboriginal people of Canada

References

External links
 Blanche Macdonald Centre
 The History of Metropolitan Vancouver's Hall of Fame

Canadian Métis people
Métis politicians
1931 births
1985 deaths